Elegia relictella is a species of snout moth in the genus Elegia. It was described by Aristide Caradja in 1925 and is known from Guangdong, China.

References

Moths described in 1925
Phycitini
Taxa named by Aristide Caradja